The 1980–81 New York Knicks season was the 35th season for the team in the National Basketball Association (NBA). In the regular season, the Knicks finished in third place in the Atlantic Division with a 50–32 win–loss record, qualifying for the 1981 NBA Playoffs. New York lost in the best-of-three first round to the Chicago Bulls in a two-game sweep.

NBA Draft

Note: This is not an extensive list; it only covers the first and second rounds, and any other players picked by the franchise that played at least one game in the league.

Roster

Regular season

Season standings

Notes
z, y – division champions
x – clinched playoff spot

Record vs. opponents

Game log

Playoffs

|- align="center" bgcolor="#ffcccc"
| 1
| March 31
| Chicago
| L 80–90
| Ray Williams (19)
| Micheal Ray Richardson (13)
| Micheal Ray Richardson (6)
| Madison Square Garden14,822
| 0–1
|- align="center" bgcolor="#ffcccc"
| 2
| April 3
| @ Chicago
| W 114–115 (OT)
| Campy Russell (29)
| three players tied (6)
| three players tied (5)
| Chicago Stadium19,901
| 0–2
|-

Player statistics

Season

Playoffs

Awards and records
Micheal Ray Richardson, NBA All-Defensive First Team

Transactions

References

New York Knicks seasons
N
New York Knicks
New York Knicks
1980s in Manhattan
Madison Square Garden